Boris Georgiev (born 5 December 1982) is an amateur boxer from Bulgaria who won a bronze medal at the 2004 Summer Olympics in the light welterweight class.

Career 
In 2000 he lost the European featherweight final against Ramaz Paliani (Turkey) 5:8. The same year he won a silver medal at the World Junior Championships in Budapest, Hungary, losing the final to Gyula Kate (HUN) 17-16.

In 2002 Alexander Maletin knocked him out in the lightweight final of the European Championships. A year later at the World Championships Georgiev was knocked out by Cuban legend Mario Kindelan. He qualified for the 2004 Summer Olympics by ending up in second place at the 3rd AIBA European 2004 Olympic Qualifying Tournament in Gothenburg, Sweden.

Olympics 2004:
Defeated Nasserredine Fillali (Algeria) RSC 2 (1:38)
Defeated Rock Allen (United States) 30-10
Defeated Nurzhan Karimzhanov (Kazakhstan) 20-18
Lost to Yudel Johnson Cedeno (Cuba) 9-13

2005 at the world championships he lost to Cuban Inocente Fiss 28-19.

2006 he won the European title at junior welterweight 25:17 against Russian Oleg Komisarov.

Professional boxing record

|- style="margin:0.5em auto; font-size:95%;"
|align="center" colspan=8|7 Wins (2 (T)Knockouts, 1 decision), 0 Losses (0 (T)Knockouts, 0 decision), 0 Draws

	2012-03-04 Ideh Ockuko 4-3-0	
York Hall, Bethnal Green, London, United Kingdom

References

1982 births
Living people
Featherweight boxers
Lightweight boxers
Light-welterweight boxers
Boxers at the 2004 Summer Olympics
Boxers at the 2008 Summer Olympics
Olympic boxers of Bulgaria
Olympic bronze medalists for Bulgaria
Olympic medalists in boxing
Medalists at the 2004 Summer Olympics
Bulgarian expatriates in the United Kingdom
Bulgarian male boxers
Bulgarian people of Romani descent